Szembruczek  (German: Klein Schönbrück) is a village in the administrative district of Gmina Rogóźno, within Grudziądz County, Kuyavian-Pomeranian Voivodeship, in north-central Poland.

The village has a population of 230.

References

Szembruczek